Hyndburn Borough Council elections are generally held three years out of every four, with a third of the council elected each time. Hyndburn Borough Council is the local authority for the non-metropolitan district of Hyndburn in Lancashire, England. Since the last boundary changes in 2002, 35 councillors have been elected from 16 wards.

Political control
The first election to the council was held in 1973, initially operating as a shadow authority before coming into its powers on 1 April 1974. Since 1973 political control of the council has been held by the following parties:

Leadership
The role of mayor is largely ceremonial in Hyndburn, with political leadership instead provided by the leader of the council. The leaders since 1974 have been:

Mayors
The mayors since 1974 have been:

Council elections
Elections are usually by thirds, in three of every four years.

Borough result maps

By-election results

References

 By-election results

External links
Hyndburn Borough Council 

 
Local government in Hyndburn
Politics of Hyndburn
Accrington
Council elections in Lancashire
District council elections in England